Minerva was  a history and political magazine founded and edited by Johann Wilhelm von Archenholz. Its full title was Minerva: Ein Journal historischen und politischen Inhalts. The magazine was among the most significant history and political magazines published in the 1790s. 

The first two volumes were published in Berlin by J.T. Unger in 1792. However, its headquarters was in Hamburg. Minerva was widely read, including by such people as Johann Wolfgang von Goethe, Friedrich Schiller and Hegel. Friedrich Klopstock was one of the contributors, as was Ernst Raupach, who published "Laßt die Todten ruhen", one of the earliest vampire stories, in Minerva. The magazine had a liberal stance. It ceased publication in 1858.

References

Defunct political magazines published in Germany
German-language magazines
History magazines
Magazines established in 1792
Magazines disestablished in 1858
Magazines published in Berlin
Magazines published in Hamburg